{{Infobox former subdivision
|native_name = टोंक रियासत/ ریاستِ ٹونک
|conventional_long_name =Tonk State
|common_name = Tonk 
|nation = British India
|subdivision = Princely State
|era = 
|year_start = 1806
|date_start = 
|event_start= 
|year_end = 1949
|date_end = 
|event_end= Independence of India
|event1 = 
|date_event1 = 
| p2          = Maratha Empire
| flag_p2      = Flag of the Maratha Empire.svg
| s1 = Republic of India
|flag_s1 = Flag of India.svg
|image_flag = Flag of Tonk.svg
|image_coat = Tonk State CoA.png
|image_map = Jhalawar-Tonk map.jpg
|image_map_caption =Tonk State in the Imperial Gazetteer of India
|motto = '"Nasr min Allah"  (Victory in God)
|stat_area1 =6512
|stat_year1 =1931 
|stat_pop1 = 317,360
|capital = Tonk
|today     = Rajasthan (India)
}}
Tonk was a Princely State of India at the time of the British Raj. The town of Tonk, which was the capital of the state, had a population of 273,201 in 1901. The town was surrounded by a wall and boasted a mud fort. It had a high school, the Walter hospital for women, under a matron, and a separate hospital for men. It has a bridge on river Banas.

Amir Khan was originally enlisted by the Holkar dynasty in 1806. Tonk and the surrounding regions were captured from Jaipur State and rewarded to Amir Khan for his services. In 1817 the British acknowledged Amir Khan as the ruler of Tonk on the condition that he disbanded his army. The army of Amir Khan consisted of 52 battalions of infantry, 15,000 Pashtun cavalry and 150 artillery. Amir Khan surrendered on the condition that the British enlist his men and buy his artillery. Rampura and Aligarh were presented as gift by the British to Amir Khan for his cooperation. It was the only princely state of Rajasthan with a Muslim ruling dynasty.

Geography
The state was formed of several enclaves located in an area covered by the alluvium of the Bands, and from this, a few rocky hills composed of schists of the Aravalli Range protrude, together with scattered outliers of the Alwar quartzites. Nimbahera is for the most part covered by shales, limestone, and sandstone belonging to the Lower Vindhyan group, while the Central India districts lie in the Deccan trap area, and present all the features common to that formation.

Besides the usual small game, antelope or ravine deer, and nilgai (Boselaphus tragocamelus) used to be common in the plains, and leopards, sambar deer (Cervus unicolor)'', and wild hog were found in many of the hills. Formerly an occasional tiger was met in the south-east of Aligarh, the north-east- of Nimbahera, and parts of Pirawa and Sironj.

The total area of the princely state was 2553 sq. mi, with a total population in 1901 of 273,201. 
By treaty Tonk became a British protectorate in 1817. Following the Independence of India, Tonk acceded to the newly independent dominion of India on 7 April 1949. It was located in the region bordering present-day Rajasthan and Madhya Pradesh states that are now the Tonk district.

History
The founder of the state was Nawab Muhammad Amir Khan (1769–1834), an adventurer and military leader of Pashtun descent. Amir Khan rose to be a military commander in the service of Yashwantrao Holkar of the Maratha Empire in 1798. In 1806, Khan received the state of Tonk from Yashwantrao Holkar. In 1817, after the Third Anglo-Maratha War, Amir Khan submitted to the British British East India Company. As a result, he kept his territory of Tonk and received the title of Nawab. While retaining internal autonomy and remaining outside British India, the state came under the supervision of the Rajputana Agency and consisted of six isolated districts. Three of these were under the Rajputana Agency, namely, Tonk, Aligarh (formerly Rampura) and Nimbahera. The other three, Chhabra, Pirawa and Sironj were in the Central India Agency. The Haraoti-Tonk Agency, with headquarters at Deoli, dealt with the states of Tonk and Bundi, as well as with the state of Shahpura.

A former minister of Tonk state, Sahibzada Obeidullah Khan, was deputed on political duty to Peshawar during the Tirah campaign of 1897.

In 1899–1900, the state suffered much distress due to drought. The princely state enjoyed an estimated revenue of £128,546 in 1883–84; however, no tribute was payable to the government of British India. Grain, cotton, opium and hides were the chief products and exports of the state. Two of the outlying tracts of the state were served by two different railways.

Nawab Sir Muhammad Ibrahim Ali Khan GCIE (ruled 1867–1930) was one of few chiefs to attend both Lord Lytton's Durbar in 1877 and the Delhi Durbar of 1903 as ruler.

In 1947, on the Partition of India whereby India and Pakistan gained independence, the Nawab of Tonk decided to join India. Subsequently, most of the area of the state of Tonk was integrated into Rajasthan state, while some of its eastern enclaves became part of Madhya Pradesh.

The foundation of the principality of Tonk led to the creation of a large Rajasthani Pathan community.

Rulers
The rulers of the state, the Salarzai Nawabs of Tonk, belonged to a Pashtun Tarkani tribe. They were entitled to a 17-gun salute by the British authorities. The last ruler before Indian independence, Nawab Muhammad Ismail Ali Khan, has no issue.

Nawabs
 Muhammad Amir Khan (1806–1834)
 Muhammad Wazir Khan (1834–1864)
 Nawab Muhammad Ali Khan (1864–1867)
 Nawab Muhammad Ibrahim Ali Khan (186723 June 1930)
 Nawab Muhammad Saadat Ali Khan (23 June 193031 May 1947)
 Nawab Muhammad Faruq Ali Khan (1947–1948)

Titular Nawabs
 Nawab Muhammad Ismail Ali Khan (1948–1974)
 Nawab Masoom Ali Khan (1974–1994)
 Nawab Aftab Ali Khan (1994–)

See also
Lawa Thikana
Pathans of Rajasthan
Political integration of India
List of Sunni Muslim dynasties

References

External links

Princely states of Rajasthan
States and territories established in 1817
Muslim princely states of India
Tonk district
States and territories disestablished in 1949
1806 establishments in India
1817 establishments in India
1949 disestablishments in India
Pashtun dynasties